The Freshwater class is a class of ferry operating the Manly ferry service between Circular Quay and Manly on Sydney Harbour. The ferries are owned by the Government of New South Wales and operated by Transdev Sydney Ferries under the government's Sydney Ferries brand.

History
The need for new ferries on the Manly–Circular Quay service was identified during the mid-1970s, during which time the service was characterised by deteriorating quality and low patronage.

Decline of the Manly ferries
Prior to 1971, the ferry services on the Manly–Circular Quay route were operated by the Port Jackson & Manly Steamship Company. In that year, the company posted a modest profit of $112,000. Patronage was approaching all-time lows, but the growth prospect for ferry services was considered strong. In November 1971, the company attracted a $1.5 million takeover bid from diversified transport company Brambles Industries. The initial bid was rejected, but a later offer of $2.1 million was accepted.

Almost immediately, the hydrofoils were sold to Waltons Finance and leased back. The four ferries were all ageing and expensive to maintain, and it soon became evident that Brambles intended to close the service or sell the ships to the State Government at the earliest opportunity. Fare increases and service suspensions followed. The Bellubera was withdrawn from service on 14 December 1973; the Baragoola was to follow early the next year. Public outrage and fears that the service would be suspended entirely led to the government resuming responsibility for the operation of the ferries in February 1974.

Concerns about the on-going serviceability of the existing vessels led to a decision to modify the design of the Lady Wakehurst and Lady Northcott, then under construction for use on the inner harbour routes, so that they could be used as relief boats on the Manly run. On 27 August 1974 the public timetable was reduced to only require two ships. The decision to modify the two Lady-class vessels proved fortuitous; as both the North Head and the Baragoola had to be sent for major overhauls, and the smaller ferries acted as relief ships while these works were carried out.

During the naming ceremony for the Lady Northcott on 11 February 1975, then Liberal Minister for Transport Wal Fife announced that two new ferries would be introduced to the Manly service within three years.

The Burness Corlett report

A study by maritime consultants Burness Corlett Australia was released in July 1976. It investigated the requirements of new vessels to replace the North Head and Baragoola by 1978. Various configurations were considered, including conventional monohull, catamaran, hovercraft and hydrofoil. Planning ferries of both single and twin-hull configuration were rejected, as such a configuration cannot be double-ended and therefore would have required berthing stern-first. Hydrofoils were also rejected from consideration due to excessive cost and limited passenger capacity. Two options were selected for detailed investigation: monohull and twin-hull, both double-ended and having 1,200 passenger capacity.

Detailed designs and blueprints were prepared for both options. The study recommended the selection of the twin-hull due to the higher service frequency achievable (due to the twin-hull's faster speed of  versus ), however the study noted that other than this, there was relatively little difference between the options. The twin-hull was designed with dimensions of  length,  beam, and  draft, while the monohull design was  length,  beam, and  draft. The wider beam of the twin-hull design would exceed the limits of the existing wharves at Circular Quay, and necessitate a reconfiguration of the wharves if selected. Burness Corlett were confident that the twin-hull option was the superior choice, due to service speed and stability through Sydney Heads, and so no model tests were performed for the monohull design.

Burness Corlett predicted that either design would take approximately 21 months to construct, and that if the new ferries were to be introduced in 1978 as planned, an aggressive construction program would have to begin immediately, with tenders to be called no later than April 1976 (the report was not even released until three months after this date).

New ferries announced
After a change of government at the 1976 election, the new Labor government's Transport Minister Peter Cox announced that tenders would be called for the construction of a new "super ferry" in line with the results of the engineering study, to carry up to 1,200 passengers at speeds of 18 knots.

On 9 January 1978, the traditional three-ship Manly Ferry timetable was reintroduced. The service was operated with the Baragoola (1922), North Head (1913) and either the Lady Wakehurst or Lady Northcott. However, the modified Lady-class ships were not good substitutes for the two older vessels, as the newer Lady ferries were too small and too slow for the Manly service. Particularly the Lady-class ships were barely able to keep to the published timetable in peak hours. Following the return of the Labor Government at the State Election on 7 October 1978, the Labor Party's Alan Stewart became the Member for Manly. This provided a fresh political impetus for the State Labor administration to order the new Manly ferries.

Steelwork for Freshwater was laid down at the State Dockyard on 31 October 1980. Strike actions delayed completion until June 1982. The ferry terminals at Circular Quay and Manly were substantially modified to accommodate the larger ferries, including the installation of wide height-adjustable two-level hydraulic ramps. Additionally a new bus-interchange was built in the wharf forecourt at Manly.

Retirement 2021–2023 
There are plans to replace the Freshwater-class ferries with three new Emerald-class catamaran ferries in 2021. No decision has been made as yet on the future of the Freshwater-class ferries.

In November 2020, the Minister for Transport announced that when the new ferries are put into operation, Collaroy would be retained in service until at least 2023 for weekend operation. On 14 January 2021 it was announced that the Freshwater will also be retained for future services. The Queenscliff was retired on 13 October 2021, not long after the new Emerald-class vessels began operating. On the 13th of June 2022 it was announced that Collaroy would be retired and replaced with Queenscliff instead. Along with this it was also announced that Narrabeen's engine rebuild has been cancelled. In August 2022, word spread about one ferry running a weekday service. This was confirmed with a new timetable coming into place on September 5, running one ferry every two hours. 

Vessels
FreshwaterMV Freshwater is the lead ship of the four Freshwater-class ferries. It is named after Freshwater Beach on Sydney's Northern Beaches. It was launched on 27 March 1982 by Olive Cox and commissioned by her husband, Minister for Transport Peter Cox, on 18 December 1982.

The three-month old ferry ran aground at Manly Cove in March 1983 after overshooting the wharf following a computer failure. On 30 March 1985, Freshwater was hijacked by a man who threatened to shoot passengers unless the captain piloted the ferry beyond Sydney Heads into the ocean. The hijacker was subdued after a police officer boarded the vessel and fired three warning shots. It turned out that the man, a New Zealander, had not been carrying a gun, but an empty vodka bottle (the second of two that he had consumed before boarding the vessel) concealed under his jacket.

While there were plans to retire the ship by 2021, a decision was made to keep Freshwater and Queenscliff operating, with Narrabeen and Collaroy to be retired.

Queenscliff

MV Queenscliff is the second of the four Freshwater-class ferries to enter service. It is named after Queenscliff Beach on Sydney's Northern Beaches. It was to be retired, operating its final service on 13 October 2021. However on the 13th of June 2022 it was announced that the Queenscliff will be brought back in to service, after a refit, to replace the Collaroy due to steering problems.  
 The Queenscliff will expected to be in service by 2023.

Narrabeen

MV Narrabeen is the third of the four Freshwater-class ferries to enter service. It is named after Narrabeen Beach on Sydney's Northern Beaches. Planned to be retired in 2021, On 9 December, it was announced that Narrabeen would get a new engine and continue service. However after much delay it was announced that the Narrabeen's engine rebuild was cancelled due to supply chain issues and expenses and the vessel seems to have been officially retired. No comment has been made on the future of the vessel.

She is the third Manly ferry to be called "Narrabeen".  (I) was an 1886-built iron paddle-steamer that was hulked in 1917. Narrabeen (II) was built in 1921 and was the last of the Manly cargo ferries. She was sold out of the Manly run in 1928 and wrecked in 1958.

Collaroy

MV Collaroy is the final Freshwater-class ferry to enter service. It is named after Collaroy Beach on Sydney's Northern Beaches.

Collaroy differed from its classmates in having been equipped with underwater stabilisers and enhanced radar for use on ocean cruises. The control systems were upgraded to match that being fitted during overhauls of the other Freshwater class.

When Sydney hosted the 2000 Summer Olympics, Collaroy was the vessel used to carry the Olympic Flame across Sydney Harbour. In February 2001, Collaroy ran aground on Manly Point, putting the ferry out of service for several months and costing $2 million to repair. Collaroy was originally meant to be retained along with MV Freshwater, operating on weekends and public holidays, however on the 13th of June 2022 it was announced that Collaroy would be retired and replaced with the recently retired MV Queenscliff after Queenscliff under goes a refit.

See also
 List of Sydney Harbour ferries
 Timeline of Sydney Harbour ferries

References

Ferry transport in Sydney
Ferry classes